The 1967 season was the Minnesota Vikings' seventh in the National Football League. After the resignation of head coach Norm Van Brocklin at the end of the previous season, the Vikings hired Bud Grant, previously the head coach of the Canadian Football League's Winnipeg Blue Bombers, who led the team to a 3–8–3 record.

1967 Draft

 The New York Giants traded their 1st-round selection (2nd overall), 2nd-round selection (28th overall), 1968 1st-round selection (1st overall) and 1969 2nd-round selection (39th overall) to Minnesota for QB Fran Tarkenton.
 Los Angeles traded their 1st-round selection (15th overall) and TE/LB Marlin McKeever to Minnesota for their 2nd-round selection (33rd overall), TE Hal Bedsole and RB Tommy Mason.
 Minnesota traded their 6th-round selection (140th overall) to Pittsburgh for RB Phil King (American football).
 Minnesota traded their 8th-round selection (192nd overall) to Pittsburgh for LB Dave Tobey.
 Washington traded their 8th-round selection (197th overall) to Minnesota for DE Bill Briggs (defensive end).

Roster

Preseason

Regular season

Schedule

Standings

Statistics

Team leaders

League rankings

References

Minnesota Vikings seasons
Minnesota
Minnesota Vikings